Bret Michaels: Life As I Know It is an American reality documentary television series on VH1 that debuted October 18, 2010 and aired weekly episodes at 10:30 p.m. on Mondays. It is the series following Rock of Love and chronicles the lives of Bret Michaels and his family. Filming of the series began before Michaels' health troubles, and filming was suspended after his hospitalization. Production resumed when it was cleared by his doctors. The pilot for the series aired on May 31, 2010, one week after Michaels was announced the winner of Celebrity Apprentice 3 on NBC.

A music video was produced for "Riding Against the Wind" a song from Michaels' latest album Custom Built that also doubles as the theme song for Bret Michaels: Life As I Know It. The music video contains footage from the series and was released on October 7, 2010, exclusively on Billboard.

Episodes

References

External links
 Bret Michaels: Life As I Know It on VH1
 Bret Michaels Official Web Site
 Bret Michaels at MySpace
 Official Poison Web Site

2010s American reality television series
2010 American television series debuts
2010 American television series endings
English-language television shows
Television series by 51 Minds Entertainment
VH1 original programming